The Creative Arts Emmys are a class of Emmy Awards presented in recognition of technical and other similar achievements in American television programming. They are commonly awarded to behind-the-scenes personnel such as production designers, set decorators, video editors, costume designers, cinematographers, casting directors, and sound editors.

The Creative Arts category also includes awards for outstanding animated programs, commercials, and guest actors.

Both the Primetime and Daytime awards each present their Creative Arts Emmys at separate Creative Arts ceremonies on the weekend before their respective main ceremonies. Both the primary and the creative arts for sports are all given away at one ceremony.

Award categories

See also

 List of American television awards

References

External links
 Primetime Emmy Awards
 Daytime Emmy Awards
 Sports Emmy Awards

Emmy Awards